Bona Drag is a compilation album by Morrissey released on 15 October 1990. The album features an array of Morrissey's most popular songs from his early solo career, most of which had not been released on any previous album. The album name meaning nice outfits is an example of the subculture slang Polari explored further on the album's first track "Piccadilly Palare". The album was certified Gold by the RIAA on 6 December 2000. In 2010, the album was remastered and expanded to include six bonus tracks.

Background 
After releasing Viva Hate in March 1988, Morrissey modified his method of releasing music. Instead of choosing to produce an immediate follow-up album, he decided to release a string of independent singles in the hopes of achieving success in that market. Morrissey initially planned to release a second album after releasing a few holdover singles.

As such, he released "The Last of the Famous International Playboys", "Interesting Drug", and "Ouija Board, Ouija Board" over the course of 1989. The first two of these became top ten hits. However, by the end of 1989 it became apparent that he would not be able to put out an album of new material soon enough.

Morrissey decided to scrap the idea of a full-length LP and release a compilation of singles and B-sides instead. Thus, the Bona Drag project was born. "November Spawned a Monster" was released in May 1990 to modest success; the album and the single "Piccadilly Palare" followed, both released on the same day that October.

Composition
Bona Drag features nearly all of the strong pieces of material written by Morrissey in the first three years of his solo career. The tracks include four top ten hits, and the two singles from Viva Hate: "Suedehead" and "Everyday Is Like Sunday".

The album is also significant for including the first tracks by Morrissey to chart in the United States. "Piccadilly Palare" and "Ouija Board, Ouija Board" both reached number 2 on the Modern Rock chart. "The Last of the Famous International Playboys" went to number 3, "November Spawned a Monster", number 6, and "Interesting Drug", number 11. Bona Drag launched Morrissey's career in the US, and in many ways it marked the turning point after which he became less popular in the UK but achieved increasing success in America.

The album sleeve is taken from Morrissey's "November Spawned a Monster" promotion video. Morrissey's shirt colour was altered from black to red.

20th anniversary reissue
In October 2010, the album was reissued on the resurrected Major Minor label, with six officially unreleased studio recordings. The artwork was edited and inner artwork updated with previously unseen photos chosen by Morrissey. It entered the UK charts at number 67. The reissue notably included several edits, including removing a verse from 'Ouija Board Ouija Board' and restoring a previously cut verse to 'Piccadilly Palare'.

Track listing
All songs by Morrissey and Street, except where noted.

LP

2010 re-release 
The 2010 re-release features the following additional tracks:
 "Happy Lovers at Last United" (Outtake from "Everyday Is Like Sunday" sessions)
 "Lifeguard on Duty" (Outtake from Viva Hate sessions)
 "Please Help the Cause Against Loneliness" (demo) (Outtake from Viva Hate, previously covered by Sandie Shaw)
 "Oh Phoney" (Outtake from Bona Drag sessions) (Morrissey, Armstrong)
 "The Bed Took Fire" (early version of "At Amber")
 "Let the Right One Slip In" (alternate long mix) (Morrissey, Alain Whyte)
The following changes have been made to the original album:
 "Ouija Board, Ouija Board" has a verse removed ("The glass is moving, no, I was not pushing that time")
 "Piccadilly Palare" has an extra verse, as has circulated on bootlegs ("A cold-water room")
 "Interesting Drug" fades into "November Spawned a Monster"
 "Suedehead" edited to remove guitar fade on the intro.

Etchings on vinyl

"AESTHETICS VERSUS ATHLETICS"/none

Personnel 
Morrissey – vocals 
Kevin Armstrong (Tracks A1, A3, A7, B3-4), Craig Gannon (Track A2, A5-6, B5), Neil Taylor (A2, A5-6, B5), Vini Reilly (Tracks A4, B1-2, B6-7) – guitar
Andy Rourke (Tracks A1-3, A5-6, B3, B5), Stephen Street (Tracks A4, B1-2, B6-7) Matthew Seligman (Tracks A7, B4) – bass
Andrew Paresi (Tracks A1, A3-4, A7, B1-4, B6-7), Mike Joyce (A2, A5-6, B5) – drums
Stephen Street (Tracks A2, A5-6, B5) – keyboards
Vini Reilly (Tracks A4, B1-2, B6-7) – piano

Guest musicians 
 Graham "Suggs" McPherson – additional vocals on "Piccadilly Palare"
 Kirsty MacColl – backing vocals on "Interesting Drug"
 Mary Margaret O'Hara – additional voice on "November Spawned a Monster"

Production 
 Stephen Street – producer
 Clive Langer – producer
 Alan Winstanley – producer

Charts

Certifications and sales

References 

Morrissey albums
Albums produced by Stephen Street
Albums produced by Clive Langer
Albums produced by Alan Winstanley
B-side compilation albums
1990 compilation albums
HMV albums
Major Minor Records compilation albums